The 2020 Big East women's basketball tournament took place March 6–9, 2020 and was held at Wintrust Arena in Chicago, Illinois. The winner received the conference's automatic bid to the 2020 NCAA tournament.

Seeds

Schedule

Source:

Bracket

* denotes overtime period

See also
 2020 Big East men's basketball tournament

References

External links
Big East website

Big East women's basketball tournament
Basketball competitions in Chicago
Big East tournament
Big East tournament
College basketball tournaments in Illinois
Women's sports in Illinois